Guts: The True Stories Behind Hatchet and the Brian Books is a non-fiction book by Gary Paulsen, published on January 23, 2001 by Delacorte Books. It is about some of Paulsen's life adventures, including dog sledding in blizzards, being in a plane stalling in the air in the arctic, watching as a little boy gets stabbed to death by a young buck, and eating bugs. He discusses the inspirations of his life and the way they helped to create events for his character Brian Robeson in his Brian's Saga series.

Plot

When Paulsen was a child, his parents didn't have enough money for food and school supplies, so he worked as a pinsetter in a bowling alley for money and hunted rabbits, ducks, and grouse for food. He worked as one of two EMT volunteers in a 1000 square mile radius, using an old worn down ambulance and helping people with emergencies like heart attacks and plane crashes. He tells of how he was attacked by many moose, mosquitoes, and deer flies. He says he once was stranded while on a work trip because of a flipped canoe, losing essentials.

2001 non-fiction books
American autobiographies
Books by Gary Paulsen
Delacorte Press books